Prema Sikharam is a 1992 Indian Telugu-language romance film directed by Satya Gopal Bhatnagar. It was also released in Hindi as Anokha Premyudh in 1994. The film stars Prashanth, Mamta Kulkarni and Arun Pandiyan. 
The music was composed by Manoj Saran. The film was also dubbed in Tamil as Rojakkal Unakkaga.

Cast
Prashanth as Prashanth
Mamta Kulkarni as Preeti
Arun Pandiyan as Anthony
Sithara as Manasa

Telugu version
Ranganath as Preeti's father
Nirmalamma as Prashant's grand mother
Brahmanandam as lecturer
Babu Mohan as Preeti's paternal uncle
Sudhakar as Preeti's maternal uncle
Ali as Prashant's friend
Uttej as Prashant's friend

Hindi version
Shakti Kapoor
Aruna Irani
Satish Shah
Paintal as Ganpat
Prashant Sagar
Rami Reddy

Soundtrack

Telugu version

Hindi version

References

External links

1994 films
1990s Telugu-language films
1990s Hindi-language films
Indian multilingual films
Indian romance films
1990s multilingual films
1990s romance films
Hindi-language romance films